Oppdal Airport, Fagerhaug is an airport serving the municipality of Oppdal in Trøndelag county, Norway.

History
The airport was established by a local recreational flying club in the 1980s, and was later closed.

In 2000, industrialist Kjell Inge Røkke was completing his holiday home in Oppdal. The closest airport to Oppdal was then Molde Airport, Årø, located three hours drive away. Røkke wanted an airport to fly his business jet to Oppdal and engaged Sundt Air to renovate and reopen the airport. The airport was at the time closed because of lack of maintenance.

Facilities
It is owned and operated by Midtnorsk Fly og Luftsportssenter, which is again owned by NTNU Fallskjermklubb (35%), Våningshuset (owned by Røkke, 32%), NTH Flyklubb (17%), Oppdal Municipality (11%) and Oppdal Flyklubb (6%).

References

External links

Official website  

Airports in Trøndelag
Oppdal